This article presents a detailed, year-by-year history of Real Salt Lake (2004–present).  For other information about the professional soccer club based in Utah, please see the main article.

2004

On July 14, Major League Soccer officially awarded its 12th franchise to the state of Utah and ownership group SCP Worldwide, headed by Dave Checketts.  Steve Pastorino was named general manager of the new team, and John Ellinger was hired as head coach.  The team was officially named "Real Salt Lake" in October of that year in honor to Real Madrid.  The announcement was met with some discontent among local soccer fans (see main article), but overall, the community remained excited about the new team.

On November 17, RSL acquired the first player in club history, trading with Dallas Burn for star forward Jason Kreis.  Over the following months, the team added several players, including decorated MLS veterans Clint Mathis and Eddie Pope.  Also, the team made arrangements to play home matches at Rice-Eccles Stadium on the campus of the University of Utah, with hopes of eventually building a soccer-specific stadium in the Salt Lake area to host matches in the future.

2005

The team played its first official match on April 2, slogging through a windy, rain-soaked contest against New York MetroStars at Giants Stadium in New Jersey.  That match ended as a scoreless draw.  The following week, Jason Kreis scored the first goal in franchise history in a 3–1 loss to LA Galaxy at the Home Depot Center.  RSL returned to Utah to play its first-ever home match on April 16.  With 25,287 fans present at Rice-Eccles Stadium, Brian Dunseth scored a header in the 81st minute to deliver a 1–0 victory over the rival Colorado Rapids.

The RSL faithful were thrilled, but from that point on, the season was mostly frustration and disappointment.  The team did log back-to-back victories in May, but high hopes were quickly dashed as RSL's offense sputtered.  The team set a league record by posting a 557-minute scoreless streak (later broken by Toronto FC).  Real recovered enough to log back-to-back wins later in the year, but again met with disaster: the team lost 10 consecutive matches before managing a 2–2 draw on the road against the San Jose Earthquakes.  The season ended with a 1–0 loss at home against Colorado, giving RSL an overall record of 5-22-5 in the franchise's inaugural season.

Despite the disappointing season, there were a few highlights.  In June, Salt Lake hosted a World Cup qualifier match between Team USA and Costa Rica, drawing a boisterous crowd of 40,586 fans for the double-header at Rice-Eccles Stadium.  In August, Kreis notched his 100th career goal, becoming the first player in MLS history to reach that milestone.

2006

Real Salt Lake's sophomore season began much the way the rookie campaign ended.  The team recorded five losses and one tie in the first six matches of the season.  Overall, RSL had gone 18 consecutive matches without a victory – the longest winless streak in MLS history.  But despite hitting rock-bottom, the team responded positively.  On May 13, RSL routed LA Galaxy 3–0, with two goals scored by newly acquired forward Jeff Cunningham.  It was the first road victory in team history.  A three-game homestand produced two wins and a tie, and suddenly Real looked like a playoff contender.

However, their fortunes changed quickly, with four losses and two ties in the next six matches.  Yet RSL rebounded again, posting  five wins, one tie, and just one loss from mid-July to mid-August.  But the roller coaster season hit a low point with a demoralizing 6–0 loss at the hands of New York Red Bulls.  The team managed two wins and four draws in the last eight matches, but failed to qualify for the playoffs, finishing with a 10-13-9 record.

Cunningham provided most of Real's highlights during the up-and-down 2006 season.  He had come to Salt Lake from Colorado - in exchange for Mathis, who had been a major disappointment for RSL.  Cunningham earned the MLS Golden Boot by scoring a league-high 16 goals.  He also added 11 assists, tied for the second-highest total in the MLS.

Despite mixed results on the field, RSL scored a huge victory off the field in 2006.  After much controversy and debate (see main article), the franchise finally secured a guarantee for a state-of-the-art, soccer-specific stadium to be built in Sandy – a suburb of Salt Lake City.  The team broke ground for the structure on the morning of August 12, with representatives from soccer giant Real Madrid present, including superstar David Beckham.   That evening, RSL faced its namesake in front of a sellout crowd of 45,511 fans at Rice-Eccles Stadium.  Salt Lake made a good showing, but Real Madrid won the exhibition match, 2–0.

In September 2006, representatives from Real Salt Lake and Real Madrid signed a 10-year agreement in which the two clubs agreed to work together to promote soccer throughout both Utah and the United States. Among the provisions included in the deal were a biennial friendly match between the two teams in Salt Lake City; annual February training for the RSL squad at Real Madrid's practice facility in Spain, and the creation of a $25 million youth academy in Salt Lake City that would train up to 200 youth players ranging from ages 12 to 18. However, the deal has seemed to have been dissolved, as none of the agreed upon provisions have come true: only one friendly match was ever played between the two sides, in 2006 (which the Madrid side won 2–0), and the planned soccer complex between the two has not come to fruition, with Salt Lake opening an academy on its own in Casa Grande, Arizona in 2010.

2007

The 2007 season opened with high hopes.  Real Salt Lake boasted a formidable attack with Cunningham and Kreis up front, joined by recently signed Panamanian international Luis Tejada.  They were supported by veteran talent in the midfield and defense, such as Chris Klein, Carey Talley, and newly arrived goalkeeper Nick Rimando.  But most of the pre-season buzz surrounded up-and-coming young players in the midfield.  Mehdi Ballouchy returned after a solid rookie season in 2006, and RSL acquired highly touted Freddy Adu in an off-season trade with D.C. United.  At just 17 years old, Adu was already a three-year MLS veteran and was thought by some to be the future star of American soccer.

But the club's excitement quickly gave way to disappointment.   In the first match of the season, RSL controlled throughout, but a fluke goal by Carlos Ruiz in the final minute of stoppage time salvaged a 2–2 draw for FC Dallas on Real's home turf.  RSL was devastated by the crushing result.  The players appeared lifeless as they were outscored 6–0 in their next three games.  In a stunning move, Ellinger was fired and replaced by Kreis, who immediately retired as a player.  Also, general manager Steve Pastorino resigned and was later replaced by Garth Lagerwey.

The franchise launched a massive re-construction project that continued throughout the year.  Cunningham – who had feuded with Kreis on more than one occasion – was traded to Toronto.  Tejada was out-of-shape and played just two minutes for RSL before being released.  Adu left mid-season to pursue a career in Portugal.  By the end of the year, several other key players – such as Ballouchy and Klein – had been traded away.  In addition, veteran defender Eddie Pope retired.  The team finished with a disappointing 6-15-9 record, missing the playoffs yet again.

2008

Although the previous season seemed like a giant step backwards for RSL, the team added several players in 2007 that provided a foundation for future success.  Kyle Beckerman, Robbie Findley, and Yura Movsisyan came to Salt Lake via trades from other MLS teams, while Fabián Espíndola and Javier Morales were brought from their native Argentina to bolster the offensive attack.  Early in 2008, the club added central defenders Nat Borchers and Jamison Olave to solidify the backline.   Rimando held off rookie Chris Seitz to remain the team's first-choice goalkeeper.

As Real established chemistry together, they emerged as a force to be reckoned with – at least in Salt Lake.  RSL marched through the regular season with just one loss at home, against eight wins and six ties.  The team's home field advantage improved dramatically in October with the opening of Rio Tinto Stadium, the new soccer-specific stadium in Sandy.  However, road matches were a different story: RSL posted a dismal 2-9-4 record outside the state of Utah.

But when they desperately needed a road result in the last match of the regular season, the team came up big.  Movsisyan scored on a rebound shot in the 90th minute to secure a 1–1 draw in Colorado, good enough to clinch the first-ever playoff spot in franchise history.  2008 marked the first non-losing season for the club, as Real finished with a 10-10-10 record.  Also, Movsisyan's late strike gave the team a positive goal differential (40 goals for, 39 against) for the first time ever.

RSL advanced past Chivas USA in the first round, winning 1–0 at home and drawing 2–2 on the road.  However, the season ended in disappointing fashion, as New York Red Bulls handed RSL a rare home loss in the Western Conference Final, ending Real's postseason run.  Despite the setback, optimism ran high in the organization, knowing that the team was moving in the right direction.  Beckerman provided strong leadership as team captain, and Morales emerged as the spearhead of the offense, setting a team record with 15 assists during the regular season.

2009

The team and fans had hoped for dramatic improvement in 2009; however, the season progressed in much the same way as 2008.  Again, RSL proved nearly invincible at home, posting a 9-1-5 record in Rio Tinto Stadium, with a record-setting +23 goal differential.  However, yet again, the team struggled to maintain form during road matches.  In the final few weeks, RSL found itself in a five-way battle for the final two spots in the MLS playoffs – and Salt Lake had the fewest points of the five teams.  However, thanks to a 3–0 victory over Colorado in the final game of the regular season – combined with a miraculous series of results in several other matches around the league – RSL clinched the 8th and final position in the playoffs.  Despite finishing with a losing record overall (11-12-7), the team was granted the last spot over two other teams through a tie-breaker formula (the Rapids and D.C. United also finished the year with 40 points each).

As a "reward" for qualifying, RSL faced the top-seeded Columbus Crew in the Eastern Conference bracket.  Led by Guillermo Barros Schelotto, the Crew stood as the defending MLS champions, in addition to owning the best record in the league during the recent regular season.  Salt Lake therefore entered the two-match first round series as heavy underdogs.  Still, the team was not intimidated.  They used their strong home field advantage to post a 1–0 victory in the first match, and fought valiantly in the second leg, overcoming a 2–0 deficit to stun the Crew (3-2) in Columbus.

Having advanced on aggregate, Real now faced the Chicago Fire in the second round.  With Mexican superstar Cuauhtemoc Blanco, the Fire would be tough to beat – especially in a single match in Chicago, where RSL had never won before.  The teams played to a scoreless draw, and Salt Lake emerged victorious in the shootout (5-4) thanks to 3 huge saves by Rimando.  As improbable as it seemed, RSL claimed the Eastern Conference championship and advanced to face the LA Galaxy in the final match for the MLS Cup.

Over 46,000 fans packed into Seattle's Qwest Field to watch one of the most highly anticipated finals in MLS history.  The two teams were polar opposites.  The Galaxy were a well-established franchise, boasting several previous championships, in the giant metro area of Los Angeles.  Their roster included David Beckham – arguably the most famous athlete in the world at the time – along with American superstar Landon Donovan, and several other well-known MLS veterans.  In contrast, Real Salt Lake was a small-market franchise with very little tradition and no star players.  Yet again, they found themselves heavy underdogs, but it was a role they relished.

LA Galaxy struck first in the match, but Robbie Findley countered with a rebound shot in the 64th minute.  The teams battled to a 1–1 draw at the end of regulation, and neither team was able to score during the hard-fought overtime.  Each keeper made huge saves during the shootout, and the teams remained deadlocked after five rounds of penalty kicks.  After Rimando stopped a blast by Edson Buddle in the seventh round, Robbie Russell buried his try, giving Real Salt Lake a 5–4 victory in the shootout and thus claiming the 2009 MLS Cup championship.  Rimando was named MVP for his standout performance as goalkeeper.

RSL's title run remains one of the biggest upsets in American soccer, and stands as the only time in the history of major professional sports in the United States in which a team has claimed the league championship despite finishing the regular season with a losing record.  Real Salt Lake was formally honored by President Barack Obama at a press conference in the White House on June 4, 2010.

2010

On September 4, 2010, Real Salt Lake tied the MLS record set by the Columbus Crew the year prior (2008–2009) of 22 straight unbeaten games at home by beating the New York Red Bulls 1–0. Real Salt Lake has not lost a league game at home since May 2009.

On October 16, 2010 Real Salt Lake improved their home unbeaten streak to 25 games in a row after beating the FC Dallas 2–0. This win gave Real Salt Lake the most consecutive home games without a loss in MLS history. This streak was ended at 29 games on May 28, 2010, with their loss to the Seattle Sounders FC.

RSL simultaneously tied the record for a Single Season Home Unbeaten Streak with zero losses in Rio Tinto Stadium in the 2010 regular season. This tied the only other standing Single Season Home Unbeaten Streak, held by the San Jose Earthquakes in the 2005 season.

After a successful first season at the club, Álvaro Saborío was made Salt Lake's first ever Designated Player, signing a four-year contract with the club on December 1, 2010.

2010-11 CONCACAF Champions League

As MLS Cup champions, Real Salt Lake were placed in Group A of the 2010-11 CONCACAF Champions League with Cruz Azul of Mexico, Toronto FC of Canada and Arabe Unido of Panama. Real Salt Lake started their CONCACAF Champions League tournament on August 18 at Rio Tinto Stadium playing the Panamanian champions, Árabe Unido. Real Salt Lake won the game 2–1 with both goals scored by Alvaro Saborio. Next, Real Salt Lake went down to Mexico City to take on Cruz Azul on August 25. No American team had ever won in Mexico City before, and RSL looked to be the first. Late in the game, RSL had a commanding lead of 3 goals to 1 over Cruz Azul. However, Cruz Azul wasn't about to go down quietly, and within 12 minutes they put four goals on RSL to defeat them 5–4.

On September 15, 2010, Real Salt Lake took on Toronto FC at home, in Rio Tinto Stadium. Toronto struck early in the ninth minute, with a goal by Santos. However, Kyle Beckerman scored in the 21st minute, leading to three more goals throughout the match. RSL won the match 4–1, and took second place in Group A, behind Cruz Azul. Later that month, on September 22, Real Salt Lake went down to Panama to take on Árabe Unido for the 2nd time. This time, Real Salt Lake defeated Árabe Unido 3–2 on their home soil. Cruz Azul tied with Toronto FC the same night, and so RSL was on top of Group A with 9 points. Cruz Azul had 7 points with two more games for both teams to play.

On September 28, Real Salt Lake went north up to Canada to take on Toronto FC for a second time. RSL needed at least one more point to clinch one of the two top spots in their group in order to move on to the next round. The game ended up tying 1-1, giving RSL enough points to clinch the spot.

The 6th and final game for the first round of Group A came on October 19, when Cruz Azul came to Rio Tinto Stadium. Both teams stood on top of Group A with 10 points each, and the winner would take top of the group. With mostly second-tier players on the field, Real Salt Lake ended up beating Cruz Azul 3–1 in front of a record crowd of 20,463 fans, with two goals coming from rookie Paulo Araujo Jr. Real Salt Lake ended the first round at first place in Group A. This win also made Real Salt Lake the first ever MLS club to win its group in the CONCACAF Champions League.

After a lackluster 0–0 tie against the Columbus Crew in Columbus, Real Salt Lake defeated the Crew 4-1 back home on March 1, 2011 at Rio Tinto Stadium to advance to the semifinals. The win over Columbus made Real Salt Lake the first ever American team to advance past the quarterfinals of the CONCACAF Champions League, although two American have previously won the CONCACAF Champions Cup(LA Galaxy and DC United).

On March 15, 2011, Real Salt Lake beat Saprissa 2–0 in the first leg of the CONCACAF Champions League Semifinals at Rio Tinto Stadium and then lost 2–1 in Costa Rica on April 5, 2011. However, this was enough to secure advancement to the CONCACAF Champions League Final by an aggregate score of 3–2. Also, in doing so Real Salt Lake became the first MLS team to ever reach the CONCACAF Champions League Final.

Thanks in part to their performance in the Champions League, RSL became the first American club ever to crack the Top 25 World Rankings at WorldClubRankings.com (in April 2011).

On April 20, 2011, Real Salt Lake played their first leg of the CONCACAF Champions League Final at Estadio Tecnológico against CF Monterrey. RSL's Javier Morales was able to score an equalizing goal in the 89th minute, ending the game in a 2–2 draw. The second leg of the final was held on April 27, 2011, at Rio Tinto Stadium; Monterrey's Humberto Suazo scored the only goal of the game, giving Monterrey a 3-2 aggregate victory.

2011
In their 2011 MLS season, RSL's home unbeaten streak was ended at 29 games on May 28, 2011, with their loss to the Seattle Sounders FC. Real finished the regular season with a (15–11–8) record being third in the Western Conference, once again advancing to the MLS Playoffs. RSL defeated Seattle Sounders (3–2) aggregate in their two-game series, advancing to Face the Los Angeles Galaxy in the Conference Finals. In that game, RSL lost (3–1) to LA, being eliminated from the playoffs. RSL qualified for the 2012-13 CONCACAF Champions League since LA had won both the 2011 MLS Cup and Supporters' Shield, allowing RSL to compete in the tournament having the next best record.

2012
In 2012, Real had a successful year being second in the Western conference during the regular season. In the playoffs, RSL faced Seattle once again in the semi-finals in a home-and-home series. Their first match was a 0–0 tie. Seattle defeated Real in the second game (1–0), having RSL eliminated from the playoffs. In the 2012-13 CONCACAF Champions' League, RSL were placed in Group 2 with Herediano and Tauro. Real couldn't advance past the group stage and were eliminated from the tournament.

2013–present

In 2013, Checketts sold his stake in Real Salt Lake to minority owner Dell Loy Hansen. Before the season, the club also traded key players Jámison Olave, Fabián Espíndola and Will Johnson. RSL finished the season in second place in the Western Conference with a 16–10–8 (W-L-T) record, and reached both the Open Cup and MLS Cup finals, losing both to D.C. United and Sporting Kansas City, respectively.

After the season, head coach Jason Kreis left Real Salt Lake to become the first head coach of expansion club New York City FC, with long-time assistant coach Jeff Cassar replacing him at the helm. Despite the departure, the club finished the 2014 season in third in the Western Conference, with a record of 15–8–11 totaling 56 points, and qualified for the 2015-16 CONCACAF Champions League. In the MLS Cup Playoffs, RSL was eliminated in the conference semifinals by eventual champions LA Galaxy 5–0 on aggregate.

Despite a five-game unbeaten start to the 2015 season, the team eventually began to struggle in the standings, coupled with a loss to Sporting Kansas City in the semi-finals of the 2015 Open Cup. RSL also lost key player Nat Borchers, who they traded to the Portland Timbers before the season and all-time goalscorer Álvaro Saborío, traded away to D.C. United mid-season. Although late-season signings Luis Silva and Juan Manuel Martinez provided strong performances, the team did not qualify for the playoffs for the first time since 2007.

The 2016 season started with the Quarterfinals on the 2015–16 CONCACAF Champions League where they were eliminated by eventual runner up Tigres UANL of Liga MX by an aggregate score of 3–1. The 2016 season saw Real Salt Lake return to the playoffs but they were once again eliminated by the LA Galaxy, this time by a 3–1 score line on the road in the Western Conference play in game. In the off season, longtime legends Javier Morales and Jamison Olave did not have their options exercised by the club.

On March 20, 2017 the club announced that head coach Jeff Cassar had been dismissed from his duties only three games into the season. Daryl Shore was named interim head coach for the two games against the New York Red Bulls and Minnesota United. On March 29 it was announced that Mike Petke would take over the head coaching position following the game against Minnesota United on April 1. Despite a dazzling late season run, the team finished one point shy of making the playoffs.

The 2018 season was heralded with the opening of the new $78 million Training Center and Zion's Bank Real Academy in Herriman, Utah. The facility was praised for offering world-class training amenities year round for Real Salt Lake and the organization's other teams the NWSL's Utah Royals FC and the men's second division side Real Monarchs. It also houses the team's youth academy, which was moved from Casa Grande, Arizona, offering a single location and clear path for acquiring and developing young talent.

References

External links
 

History
Real Salt Lake